Brian O'Halloran (born October 28, 1971) is an American baseball executive serving as the general manager of the Boston Red Sox of Major League Baseball (MLB).

Biography
O'Halloran has degrees from Colby College and UCLA. His first job in baseball was as an intern for the San Diego Padres.

O'Halloran joined the Boston Red Sox in 2002 as a baseball operations assistant, and became the director of baseball operations in 2006. He was named a vice president and assistant general manager for the team in November 2011. He became a senior vice president in 2015, and was promoted to executive vice president in November 2018. 

On October 25, 2019, O'Halloran was reportedly named the Red Sox' new general manager, at the same time that Chaim Bloom was named Chief Baseball Officer, with O’Halloran reporting to him. An official announcement was made on October 28, an off-day of the 2019 World Series.

Personal
In addition to English, O'Halloran speaks Georgian and Russian; he previously studied in Georgia and worked in Moscow. O'Halloran and his wife, Jean, have three children.

References

Further reading

Living people
1971 births
Colby College alumni
University of California, Los Angeles alumni
Boston Red Sox executives
Major League Baseball general managers